Mohammad Shahir (also Romanized as Moḩammad Shāhīr; also known as Moḩammad Shā‘er) is a village in Maraveh Tappeh Rural District, in the Central District of Maraveh Tappeh County, Golestan Province, Iran. At the 2006 census, its population was 130, in 24 families.

References 

Populated places in Maraveh Tappeh County